The 2015–16 Savannah State Tigers basketball team represented Savannah State University during the 2015–16 NCAA Division I men's basketball season. The Tigers, led by 11th year head coach Horace Broadnax, played their home games at Tiger Arena and were members of the Mid-Eastern Athletic Conference. They finished the season 16–16, 9–7 in MEAC play to finish in fifth place. They defeated Delaware State and Bethune-Cookman to advance to the semifinals of the MEAC tournament where they lost to Hampton. They were invited to the CollegeInsdier.com Tournament where they lost in the first round to Texas–Arlington.

Roster

Schedule

|-
!colspan=9 style="background:#; color:white;"| Exhibition

|-
!colspan=9 style="background:#; color:white;"| Regular season

|-
!colspan=9 style="background:#; color:white;"| MEAC tournament

|-
!colspan=9 style="background:#; color:white;"| CIT

References

Savannah State Tigers basketball seasons
Savannah State
Savannah State
Savannah State Tigers basketball team
Savannah State Tigers basketball team